Diadegma aztecum is a wasp first described by Cameron in 1904. No subspecies are listed.

References

aztecum
Insects described in 1904